Albert Renger-Patzsch (June 22, 1897 – September 27, 1966) was a German photographer associated with the New Objectivity.

Biography
Renger-Patzsch was born in Würzburg and began making photographs by age twelve. After military service in the First World War he studied chemistry at the Königlich-Sächsisches Polytechnikum in Dresden. In the early 1920s he worked as a press photographer for the Chicago Tribune before becoming a freelancer and, in 1925, publishing a book, Das Chorgestühl von Kappenberg (The Choir Stalls of Cappenberg). He had his first museum exhibition in Lübeck in 1927.

A second book followed in 1928,  Die Welt ist schön (The World is Beautiful). This, his best-known book, is a collection of one hundred of his photographs in which natural forms, industrial subjects and mass-produced objects are presented with the clarity of scientific illustrations. The book's title was chosen by his publisher; Renger-Patzsch's preferred title for the collection was Die Dinge ("The Things").

In its sharply focused and matter-of-fact style, his work exemplifies the esthetic of the New Objectivity that flourished in the arts in Germany during the Weimar Republic. Like Edward Weston in the United States, Renger-Patzsch believed that the value of photography was in its ability to reproduce the texture of reality, and to represent the essence of an object. He wrote: "The secret of a good photograph—which, like a work of art, can have esthetic qualities—is its realism ... Let us therefore leave art to artists and endeavor to create, with the means peculiar to photography and without borrowing from art, photographs which will last because of their photographic qualities."

Among his works of the 1920s are Echeoeria (1922) and Viper's Head ( 1925). During the 1930s Renger-Patzsch made photographs for industry and advertising. His archives were destroyed during the Second World War. In 1944 he moved to Wamel, Möhnesee, where he lived the rest of his life.

Notes

References
Gernsheim, Helmut (1962). Creative Photography: Aesthetic Trends, 1839-1960. Courier Dover Publications. .
Hambourg, Maria M., Gilman Paper Company., & Metropolitan Museum of Art (New York, N.Y.). (1993). The Waking dream: Photography's first century: selections from the Gilman Paper Company collection. New York: Metropolitan Museum of Art. .
Magilow, Daniel H. (ed) (2022). The Absolute Realist: Collected Writings of Albert Renger-Patzsch, 1923–1967. Los Angeles: Getty Publications . 
Michalski, Sergiusz (1994). New Objectivity. Cologne: Benedikt Taschen. 
Schmied, Wieland (1978). Neue Sachlichkeit and German Realism of the Twenties. London: Arts Council of Great Britain. 
Wilde, Ann, Jürgen Wilde and Thomas Weski (eds) (1997).  Albert Renger-Patzsch: Photographer of Ojectivity.  London: Thames and Hudson.  .  Translation of Albert Renger-Patzsch: Meisterwerke.  Munich: Schirmer/Mosel, 1997.

Further reading
Gelderloos, Carl. "Simply Reproducing Reality—Brecht, Benjamin, and Renger-Patzsch on Photography," German Studies Review 37.3 (2014): 549–573.
Jennings, Michael. “Agriculture, Industry, and the Birth of the Photo-Essay in the Late Weimar Republic,” October 93 (2000): 23–56.

External links 
 A profile of Albert Renger-Patzsch
 Albert Renger-Patzsch and the 'New Objectivity'
 An inventory of the Albert Renger-Patzsch Papers at the Getty Research Institute

1897 births
1966 deaths
Artists from Würzburg
Photographers from Bavaria
People from the Kingdom of Bavaria
TU Dresden alumni